Sèmè-Kpodji  is a town, arrondissement, and commune in the Ouémé Department of south-eastern Benin. The commune covers an area of 250 square kilometres and as of 2013 had a population of 222,701 people.

References

Communes of Benin
Arrondissements of Benin
Populated places in the Ouémé Department